Goodwin Peak is a peak,  high, standing  northeast of Mount Bolton, at the west side of Haworth Mesa, in the Wisconsin Range of Antarctica. It was mapped by the United States Geological Survey from surveys and U.S. Navy air photos, 1960–64, and was named by the Advisory Committee on Antarctic Names after Commander Edmund E. Goodwin, Public Affairs Officer on the staff of the Commander, U.S. Naval Support Force, Antarctica, during Operation Deep Freeze 1965 and 1966.

References

Mountains of Marie Byrd Land